Hambach (Lorraine Franconian: Hombach) is a town and commune in the Moselle department in Grand Est in north-eastern France. It belongs to the historic region of Lorraine and is close to Sarreguemines and the German border.

The major manufacturing plant of British company Ineos Automotive, who are building the Grenadier 4x4 is located in Hambach.

Population

History
Because of its historically disputed location in Lorraine, Hambach switched several times between Germany and France.

 1200 - 1766: Kingdom of Germany as part of Holy Roman Empire
 1766 - 1871: France
 1871 - 1918: German Empire
 1918 - 1940: France
 1940 - 1944: Nazi Germany
 since 1945: France

See also
 Communes of the Moselle department

References

External links
 

Communes of Moselle (department)